The Rector Street station is a local station on the BMT Broadway Line of the New York City Subway. Located at the corner of Rector Street and Trinity Place in Financial District, Lower Manhattan, the station is served by the R train at all times except late nights, when the N train takes over service. The W train also serves this station on weekdays.

Station layout 

Since the station is on a grade, there is a noticeable slant. The station has two side platforms, and there are no overpasses, underpasses, or mezzanines to connect the platforms within fare control. The station was overhauled in the late 1970s. The original trim lines were replaced with white cinderblock tiles, except for small recesses in the walls, which contain blue-painted cinderblock tiles. The staircases were repaired and new platform edges were installed. The blue cinderblock field contains the station-name signs and white text pointing to the exits. The renovation also replaced incandescent lighting with fluorescent lighting.

The uptown platform maintains one old style sign while at the north end of the downtown/Brooklyn platform is an entire closed off portion of the platform. There are several (painted over) old style Rector Street mosaic signs on this platform.

Directly to the south, the BMT Broadway Line curves southeast under the Cunard Building and Bowling Green Offices Building to reach the Whitehall Street station.

Exits
Each platform has its own platform-level fare controls. The full-time exit is at the north end of the station, at Rector Street and Trinity Place. The uptown platform contains a token booth and three street stairs: two to the northeast corner of the aforementioned intersection, and one to the southeast corner. The downtown platform is unstaffed and has four street stairs: two to the southwest corner and two to the northwest corner.

Just south of the fare control for the downtown platform, there are two exit-only turnstiles leading to an exit-only stair to the western side of Trinity Place.

At the extreme south end of the station, there is another street stair from the uptown platform to the northwest corner of Greenwich and Morris Streets, directly across from Elizabeth H. Berger Plaza and the entrance to the separate Rector Street station on the IRT Broadway–Seventh Avenue Line.

The downtown platform is proposed to become ADA-accessible with the construction of an elevator leading from an easement in 50 Trinity Place to the downtown platform. The elevator's installation was required per zoning regulations, which mandated that the developers of 77 Greenwich Street (also known as 42 Trinity Place) fund transit improvements at the station. However, whether the elevator will be installed has been unknown since April 2020 due to various lawsuits involving the MTA and FIT Investment Corp (the developer for 50 Trinity Place). The MTA and the developers of 77 Greenwich Street allege that FIT Investment Corp "has blocked the MTA and 42 Trinity from building the elevator with more than a year of stalling, empty promises and excuses. They have continued to occupy the sidewalk, and, when we tried to stop them, sued the MTA." However, FIT Investment Corp claims that it is "actually constructing a component of this station’s accessibility project, specifically the mechanical room for the elevator equipment."

Nearby points of interest 
 65 Broadway
 American Stock Exchange Building
 Cunard Building
 Empire Building
 Robert and Anne Dickey House
 Trinity Church

Image gallery

References

External links 

 
 Station Reporter — N Train
 Station Reporter — R Train
 Rector Street entrance from Google Maps Street View
 entrance near Brooklyn Battery Tunnel from Google Maps Street View
 Platforms from Google Maps Street View

BMT Broadway Line stations
New York City Subway stations in Manhattan
Railway stations in the United States opened in 1918
1918 establishments in New York City
Financial District, Manhattan